Evano Oruvan is a 2007 Tamil-language drama film directed by Nishikant Kamat who made his debut in the Tamil film industry with the film. It is a remake of Kamat's critically acclaimed Marathi film, Dombivli Fast, which is loosely based on the Michael Douglas starrer 1993 Hollywood film Falling Down. It stars Madhavan and Sangeetha, with director Seeman acting in a pivotal role. The film's music is composed by P. Sameer and the title song by G. V. Prakash Kumar. It is produced by noted Hindi directors Abbas Burmawalla and Mustan Burmawalla as they make their debuts as Tamil film producers under the distribution of their home banner, Burmawalla Limited. It had been previously named, Ivan Yaaro. The film's title is based on a song from Alaipayuthey (2000).

Plot
Sridhar Vasudevan is a middle-class family man employed in a bank. He is very idealistic, principled, and recognizes a deep sense of belonging with the society he is part of. He gets annoyed and flustered by illegal and semi-legal activities happening around him. His wife Vatsala persistently demands he should be more 'flexible' and make more money, but Sridhar does not accede. He endures the illegal and semi-legal activities around him because he anticipates a change in the mindsets of people. He feels that over time, they will become more honest, socially aware and willing to make small personal sacrifices for the greater good of all (like him).

Vatsala is a typical middle-class housewife and a caring mother of two children, Varsha and Varun. Societal imperfections and related problems matter very little to her. She is more concerned about her reactive husband, thinking about ways to save him from the effects of his angry outbursts and to steer him away from his impractical thoughts and deeds.

At a certain point in life, Sridhar faces a case of deceit that compels him to take action. Provoked by his deep anger and guilt, he decides to retaliate for wrongs done to him, violently if required. When charged 2 rupees extra for a cool drink, he picks up a cricket bat and smashes the shop. From that incident onward, Sridhar progresses, taking law in his own hands and trying to bring about instant changes wherever needed. A string of incidents occur; he thrashes the Area Councillor, the insincere hospital employees, water supplier, and many more. Sridhar's anger goes beyond these incidents, targeting individuals who do not follow norms created for their own benefit. Nishikanth Kamath has presented Sridhar as a representative for every common man in today's society, who, even after seeing and going through such wrong things, tolerates them to avoid getting his settled routine disturbed. Because of his behaviour and approach, Sridhar is termed as a criminal, harmful to his fellow men.

Inspector Vetri Maran is appointed to shoot Sridhar in an arranged 'encounter'. Vetri Maran, though not of the incorruptible kind, feels bad about the police-corruption nexus. He is a goodhearted cop and inwardly feels justified by Sridhar's approach. He comes to a quiet agreement with the young man, personally approves his action, then arranges for the 'encounter killing'. At the end, Sridhar is shot dead by Vetri Maran.

Cast
 Madhavan as Sridhar Vasudevan
 Sangeetha as Vathsala Vasudevan
 Seeman as Vetri Maran
 Mirchi Senthil as Sridhar's friend
 Devadarshini as Vetri Maran's wife
Bayilwan Ranganathan as Police Inspector
Sampath Ram
 Dinesh

Reviews
Evano Oruvan got very favourable reviews, with Rediff calling it a "must-watch" and Sify Moviebuzz giving it a "very good" rating.

Song
The film stars only one song "Unathu Enathu Endru Ulagil Enna Ullathu", music composed by G. V. Prakash Kumar and penned by Na. Muthukumar, a soundtrack was not released. The film score (played at the end) was composed by P. Sameer plays a very important role in expressing the complete view and message of the movie.

See also
 Dombivali Fast
 Falling Down

References

External links

2007 films
Tamil remakes of Marathi films
Indian vigilante films
2000s Tamil-language films
Films scored by G. V. Prakash Kumar
Indian drama films
Indian remakes of American films
Films directed by Nishikant Kamat
2007 drama films